Cornuscoparia is a genus of longhorn beetles of the subfamily Lamiinae, containing the following species:

 Cornuscoparia annulicornis (Heller, 1897)
 Cornuscoparia meeki Breuning, 1980
 Cornuscoparia ochracea Jordan, 1894
 Cornuscoparia schlaginhaufeni (Heller, 1910)

References

Lamiini